Ezrom Legae (1938–1999) was a South African sculptor and draughtsman.

Born in Vrededorp, Johannesburg, Legae studied at the Polly Street Art Centre beginning in 1959; from 1960 until 1964 he attended the Jubilee Art Centre and worked with Cecil Skotnes and Sydney Khumalo.  In 1965 he became a teacher, subsequently becoming codirector of the Jubilee Art Centre.  In 1970 he received a scholarship that allowed him to travel to Europe and the United States; between 1972 and 1974 he was director of the African Music and Drama Association Art Project.

Legae worked full-time as an artist; he lived in Soweto with his family until his death.

Legae is best known for his powerful visual commentaries on the pathos and degradation of apartheid - a critique he extended to the persistence of poverty and racism in the post-apartheid years. He excelled as painter and sculptor of figures, heads and animals working with oil, conté, bronze, clay and mixed media.

References
Bio at the National Museum of African Art
South African History Online
 

1938 births
1999 deaths
South African sculptors
South African contemporary artists
People from Johannesburg
20th-century sculptors